Francesco Bracciolini (26 November 1566 – 31 August 1645) was an Italian poet.

Biography 
Bracciolini was born of a noble family in Pistoia in 1566. On his removing to Florence he was admitted into the academy there, and devoted himself to literature. At Rome he entered the service of Cardinal Maffeo Barberini, with whom he afterwards went to France. After the death of Clement VIII he returned to his own country; and when his patron Barberini was elected pope, under the name of Urban VIII, Bracciolini repaired to Rome and was made secretary to the pope's brother, Cardinal Antonio Marcello Barberini.

Bracciolini had also the honor conferred on him of taking a surname from the arms of the Barberini family, which were bees; whence he was afterwards known by the name of Bracciolini dell'Api. During Urban's pontificate the poet lived at Rome in considerable reputation, though at the same time he was censored for his sordid avarice.

On the death of the pontiff Bracciolini returned to Pistoia, where he died in 1645. There is scarcely any species of poetry, epic, dramatic, pastoral, lyric or burlesque, which Bracciolini did not attempt; but he is principally noted for his mock-heroic poem Lo Scherno degli Dei published in 1618, similar but confessedly inferior to the contemporary work of Alessandro Tassoni, La secchia rapita. Of his serious heroic poems the most celebrated is La Croce Racquistata.

Works

References

External links

 

Italian poets
Italian male poets
1566 births
1645 deaths